Robert Earl Buckley (born May 2, 1981) is an American actor, known for his roles as Major Lillywhite on The CW's comedy-drama series iZombie from 2015 until 2019, Kirby Atwood on NBC's comedy-drama series Lipstick Jungle and Clay Evans on The CW's teen drama series One Tree Hill. Buckley also starred as Brian Leonard on ABC's horror drama series 666 Park Avenue.

Early life
Buckley was born in Claremont in Los Angeles County, California. He earned a degree in economics from the University of California, San Diego, graduating in 2003. As a college student, Buckley appeared as a contestant on The Price Is Right. After working for a year as an economic consultant, he moved back to Los Angeles to pursue a career in acting.

Career
In 2006, Buckley made his acting debut as a series regular on the MyNetworkTV primetime telenovela Fashion House, playing the role of Michael Bauer. Buckley then made his feature film debut in the horror When a Killer Calls, released in February 2006. He subsequently joined the cast of another MyNetworkTV telenovela, portraying the role of Matthew Wakefield in American Heiress. In 2007, Buckley guest starred on an episode of Ghost Whisperer. Also in 2007, he was cast in the recurring role of Kirby Atwood on NBC's comedy-drama series Lipstick Jungle.

The following year, Buckley signed on to play surf instructor Kyle Hamilton in the Lifetime film Flirting with Forty, alongside Heather Locklear. He then co-starred as Nik in the horror comedy Killer Movie, alongside Kaley Cuoco, Leighton Meester, and Paul Wesley, which premiered at the Tribeca Film Festival in April 2008. In 2009, The CW announced that Buckley would appear in a two-episode guest arc on the comedy-drama series Privileged as David Besser.

In June 2009, it was announced that Buckley had signed to star as a series regular on The CW's teen drama series One Tree Hill. He played the role of sports agent Clay Evans and remained with One Tree Hill until the series' ending in April 2012. In February 2010, Buckley was reported to be in the running for the title role in Marvel's Captain America: The First Avenger, but the part ultimately went to Chris Evans.

From 2012 to 2013, Buckley starred in the short-lived horror drama series 666 Park Avenue, portraying struggling playwright Brian Leonard who moves into a haunted building with his wife. In 2013, he was cast in a two-episode guest arc on season three of The CW's comedy-drama series Hart of Dixie. The following year, he co-starred in the Veronica Mars web spin-off series Play It Again, Dick, featuring Ryan Hansen in the central role. In 2015, he began starring as Major Lilywhite on The CW's comedy-drama horror series iZombie. In June 2016, Buckley was cast to star in the first episode of the Hulu anthology series Dimension 404, alongside Lea Michele and Joel McHale.

Personal life
In May 2018, Buckley married actress Jenny Wade. They have one child together.

Filmography

Film

Television

References

External links

 
 

1981 births
21st-century American male actors
American male film actors
American male television actors
Living people
Male actors from Los Angeles County, California
Male models from California
People from Claremont, California
University of California, San Diego alumni